Joseph Ser (1875–1954) was a French  mathematician, of whom little was known till now. He published 45 papers between 1900 and 1954, among which four monographs, edited in Paris by Henry Gauthier-Villars. In the main, he worked on number theory and  infinite series. 

He got important results in the domain of factorial series. His representation of Euler's constant as a series of rational terms  is well known. It was used in 1926 by Paul Appell (1855–1930), in an unsuccessful attempt to prove the irrationality of Euler's constant.

References 

 Ser, Joseph : Sur une expression de la fonction ζ(s) de Riemann (Upon an expression for Riemann's ζ function). CRAS (Paris) vol.182(1926),1075-1077
Ayoub, Raymond G.: Partial triumph or total failure ? The mathematical Intelligencer, vol.7, No 2(1985),55-58. This  paper explains exactly Appell's mistake  (4 - Appell and the irrationality of Euler's constant).

French mathematicians
1875 births
1954 deaths